Yuri Isaakovich Alexandrov is a Russian opera director. His 1999 production of Prokofiev‘s Semyon Kotko won The Golden Mask (Russia‘s highest theatre award) in the categories of "Best Opera Production", "Best Opera Director", "Best Opera Designer", and "Best Opera Conductor".

Background
In 1974 Alexandrov graduated from the Leningrad Conservatory as a pianist, and in 1977 he graduated from the faculty of musical stage direction.

Since 1978 he has worked as a stage director at the Mariinsky Theatre, and in 1987 Alexandrov founded the Chamber Music Theatre. Initially conceived as a creative "laboratory", with time it developed into the professional Saint Petersburg Chamber Opera Company.

References
Bolshoimoscow.com: Yury Alexandrov (Stage Director)

Russian theatre directors
Living people
Year of birth missing (living people)